Tapajós was the name for a proposed new Brazilian state, which would consist of the western part of the current state of Pará. Along with a simultaneous proposal to create another state called Carajás from another part of Pará, the proposal was defeated in a referendum in 2011 and by law could not be revived until 2015; as of 2019, no new such proposal has been made. Although voters within the territory of the proposed new states voted strongly in favor, the vote was strongly negative among the much larger population in what would have remained of Pará.

Municipalities
The new state's largest city and proposed capital would be Santarém. As of 2011, its GDP of BRL 6.4 billion constituted 11% of the total GDP of Pará. The planned Belo Monte Dam would be located on the border of the territory of Tapajós with either the new, smaller Pará or the also proposed new state of Carajás.

The two most populous municipalities would be Santarém (population 294,774) and Altamira (population 105,030).

List of municipalities in the proposed state

2011 referendum

In a referendum held on December 11, 2011, the residents of the entire state of Pará were asked to vote on proposals to split the state into three parts: Tapajós in the west, Carajás in the southeast, and a rump Pará in the northeast. The proposal to create Tapajós was defeated by a margin of 66.1% to 33.9%. Voting was highly polarized regionally, with voters in the territories of the proposed new states voting strongly in favor, while voters in the rump Pará voted strongly against. In particular, more than 90% of voters in Santarém voted in favor, while more than 90% of voters in Pará's capital city of Belém voted against. As Belém and its surrounding area comprise over half the population of the original state, the proposal had no chance of passing. The mayor of Santarém, Maria do Carmo, vowed to continue efforts to create the new state.

References

External links

See also

 Carajás - the other proposed state to be carved out of Pará, with the proposal also defeated in the December 2011 referendum

Pará
Proposed states and territories of Brazil